Michael Barr (born January 22, 1937) is an American mathematician who is the Peter Redpath Emeritus Professor of Pure Mathematics at McGill University.

Early life and education
He was born in Philadelphia, Pennsylvania, and graduated from the 202nd class of Central High School in June 1954. He graduated from the University of Pennsylvania in February 1959 and received a PhD from the same school in June 1962.

Career 
Barr taught at Columbia University and the University of Illinois before coming to McGill in 1968.

His earlier work was in homological algebra, but his principal research area for a number of years has been category theory. He is well known to theoretical computer scientists for his book Category Theory for Computing Science with Charles Wells, as well as for the development of *-autonomous categories and Chu spaces which have found various applications in computer science. His monograph *-autonomous categories, and his books Toposes, Triples, and Theories, also coauthored with Wells, and Acyclic Models, are aimed at more specialized audiences.

He is on the editorial boards of Mathematical Structures in Computer Science and the electronic journal Homology, Homotopy and Applications, and is editor of the electronic journal Theory and Applications of Categories.

References

External links
 Toposes, Triples and Theories, updated edition of text published in 1983.
 Category Theory for Computing Science updated edition of text published in 1999. 
 http://www.tac.mta.ca/tac (Theory and Applications of Categories)
 https://web.archive.org/web/20080704125156/http://www.math.rutgers.edu/hha/geninfo.html (Homology, Homotopy and Applications)
 

1937 births
Living people
Mathematicians from Philadelphia
Central High School (Philadelphia) alumni
University of Pennsylvania School of Arts and Sciences alumni
Academic staff of McGill University
Canadian mathematicians
Canadian computer scientists
Anglophone Quebec people
Category theorists